Janina Breuer (born 16 November 1998) is a German Paralympic swimmer. She is a double World champion and was the youngest member of the German team at the 2016 Summer Paralympics.

References

External links
 
 

1998 births
Living people
German female medley swimmers
German female backstroke swimmers
German female freestyle swimmers
German female butterfly swimmers
S14-classified Paralympic swimmers
Paralympic swimmers of Germany
Swimmers at the 2016 Summer Paralympics
Medalists at the World Para Swimming Championships
Medalists at the World Para Swimming European Championships
Sportspeople from Aachen
Sportspeople from Karlsruhe
20th-century German women
21st-century German women